Million Dollar Pursuit is a 1951 film noir crime film directed by R. G. Springsteen and starring Penny Edwards, Grant Withers and Norman Budd. The film's art direction was by Frank Hotaling.

Plot

Cast
 Penny Edwards as Ronnie LaVerne  
 Grant Withers as Carlo Petrov  
 Norman Budd as Monte Norris  
 Michael St. Angel as Police Lieut. Matt Whitcomb  
 Rhys Williams as Waxman 'Waxey' Wilk  
 Mikel Conrad as Louie Palino  
 Paul Hurst as Ray Harvey  
 Denver Pyle as Nick Algren  
 Ted Pavelec as Muller  
 John De Simone as Speed Nelson  
 Don Beddoe as Bowen  
 Ed Cassidy as Deputy Sheriff 
 Edward Clark as Holcomb  
 John Hamilton as Police Inspector Morgan  
 George Brand as Parker  
 Jack Shea as Police Lieut. Spears 
 Bill Baldwin as Radio Announcer  
 Noel Reyburn as Henley 
 Sam Sebby as Driver

References

Bibliography
  Len D. Martin. The Republic Pictures Checklist: Features, Serials, Cartoons, Short Subjects and Training Films of Republic Pictures Corporation, 1935-1959. McFarland, 1998.

External links
 

1951 films
1951 crime films
American crime films
Films directed by R. G. Springsteen
Republic Pictures films
American black-and-white films
1950s English-language films
1950s American films